Hermann Park is a  urban park in Houston, Texas, situated at the southern end of the Museum District. The park is located immediately north of the Texas Medical Center and Brays Bayou, east of Rice University, and slightly west of the Third Ward. Hermann Park is home to numerous cultural institutions including the Houston Zoo, Miller Outdoor Theatre, the Houston Museum of Natural Science, and the Hermann Park Golf Course, which became one of the first desegregated public golf courses in the United States in 1954. The park also features the Mary Gibbs and Jesse H. Jones Reflection Pool, numerous gardens, picnic areas, and McGovern Lake, an  recreational lake.

One of Houston's oldest public parks, Hermann Park was created on acreage donated to the City of Houston by  oilman and philanthropist George H. Hermann (1843–1914). The land was formerly the site of his sawmill. It was first envisioned as part of a comprehensive urban planning effort by the city of Houston in the early 1910s. Following the recommendation of a 1913 report which identified the then-rural area between Main Street and Brays Bayou as ideal for a large urban park, real estate investor and entrepreneur George H. Hermann, who owned most of the area and served on the city's parks board, bequeathed his estate to Houston for use as a public green space in 1914. By 1916, famed landscape architect George Kessler had completed a master plan for the park which was gradually implemented throughout the following decades. Ultimately, Hermann Park and Rice University are two clear expressions of the City Beautiful movement in Houston.

The opening of the Houston Zoo in 1922 and the requisition of a large southern portion of the park for the establishment of the Texas Medical Center in 1943 fundamentally altered the scope and configuration of the space, though significant elements of the Kessler plan—such as the north-south axis extending from Montrose Boulevard—remain and have been expanded upon. Hermann Park experienced a period of neglect in the latter half of the 20th century due to a lack of funding and maintenance, spurring the formation of the nonprofit Hermann Park Conservancy in 1992. The Conservancy has since leveraged over $120 million of public and private funds to renovate and remake broad areas of the park. Today, Hermann Park welcomes over six million visitors annually; the Houston Zoo was the second most visited paid-admission zoo in the United States in 2016 (behind San Diego Zoo), with over 2.5 million visitors.

Hermann Park is served by the Hermann Park / Rice University station on the METRORail Red Line, which runs along Fannin Street at the western edge of the park.

The Third Ward Redevelopment Council defines Hermann Park as being part of the Third Ward. T. R. Witcher of the Houston Press wrote in 1995 that the park and nearby areas are "not the first places that come to mind when you say "Third Ward,"[...]".

History 
1899 – Mayor Sam Brashear selected and purchased a site that would later on become the city’s first park in June 1899. Prior to the purchase of the park, he formed the first park committee who oversaw the purchase and would later become Sam Houston Park.
1907 – The Houston Civic Club placed the Brownie statue donated to the City of Houston in Sam Houston Park.  Brownie was created by artist Louis Amateis in 1905, and was first used as a children's water fountain. Over the years it has been stolen and recovered several times before finally residing in front of Miller Outdoor Theatre.
1914 – George E. Kessler designed the entrance of Hermann Park.
Its main feature that it had grass greens as opposed to the more commonly used sand in other cities and was well received by golfers.
1936 – for the City’s 100th anniversary, the Daughters of Republic of Texas had a log cabin constructed in Hermann Park as a memorial to pioneer men and women.
1957 – Southern Pacific steam engine #982 was dedicated at Hermann Park and the Mini-train service was established. The engine was saved after a newspaper letter from Peter Whitney got 75 replies and Southern Pacific donated the engine to the Junior Chamber of Commerce and the city. It took 5 days to move it from Blodgett to the Park, as rails were laid in the streets in front of it. The locomotive was relocated by 50 wheel trailer to Minute Maid Park in 2005.

The Hermann Park Conservancy 
Hermann Park was presented to the City of Houston by George Hermann in 1914, and is now Houston's most historically significant public green space. Over the years, the Houston Zoo, Miller Outdoor Theatre, the Houston Museum of Natural Science, and one of the first desegregated public golf courses in the United States all have added to the Park's importance as a recreational destination.

By the late 1980s however, due to insufficient public resources and very high public attendance, the park became rundown and entered a state of disrepair. In response, a group of committed and visionary Houstonians formed the nonprofit organization known as the Friends of Hermann Park (FHP) to encourage the development of more attractive, usable green space in Hermann Park and to promote the restoration of the Park to its originally intended standards of beauty.

Creating the Conservancy, Transforming the Park
In 1993, FHP commissioned a master plan for Hermann Park from Hanna/Olin Partnership of Philadelphia. This Master Plan, created in consultation with the City of Houston and various stakeholders, was adopted in 1997 by Houston City Council. In 1995, Friends of Hermann Park adopted a master plan for Hermann Park that has provided a “blueprint” for all subsequent renovations and enhancements to the Park. In 2004, Friends of Hermann Park changed its name to the Hermann Park Conservancy (HPC) to reflect an institutional and permanent commitment to stewardship of Hermann Park’s natural resources and physical infrastructure.

In an international competition, the Rice Design Alliance invited designers to set the tone and revitalize the main entry and reflecting pool that formed a key axis for Hermann Park, “The Heart of the Park”, and to create a contemporary update to the park's earliest plans by George Kessler and a subsequent, more formal Hare & Hare plan in 1936.
SWA Group, an international landscape and urban design firm working in conjunction with W.O. Neuhaus Architects and other consultants, was selected over 100 respondents. The most striking of the changes to the  project area was a narrower, more inviting  by  reflection pool. It establishes the formal central axis for the space and its slight narrower design afforded elegant pedestrian promenades as well as a double-row of mature Live Oak trees – one row that had been planted in the 1920s to honor veterans of WW I, and a second row that was added as part of the project.
Noted in a winning entry for the 2005 National Award of Excellence from the American Society of Landscape Architects, the “Heart of the Park” reflecting pool utilized a biofiltration system of gravel beds and perforated pipes to trap organics so that they naturally decompose. Porous paving systems and decomposed granite also limit potential damage from increased water run-off from the site.

Ongoing projects

The Hermann Park Conservancy continues working in partnership with the City of Houston to secure funds and manage the design of projects to be undertaken in the Park:
 Mary Gibbs and Jesse H. Jones Reflection Pool
 Molly Ann Smith and Sara H. and John H. Lindsey Plazas
 Enlargement, renovation and beautification of McGovern Lake (including three new islands as well as bird and wetland habitat area.)
 The West Entrance facility and plaza for the Houston Zoo.
 Beautification and re-alignment of North MacGregor Street to improve access and circulation in and around the Park and the Texas Medical Center.
 Acquisition of additional land and capital improvements to Bayou Parkland, an  area in Hermann Park along Brays Bayou being "reclaimed" for healthier activities and used extensively for stewardship programs.
 Creation and implementation of extensive stewardship programs, including Field Studies 101, Natural Guard, and Scouting Around Hermann Park.
 Completion of the expansion and renovation of Miller Outdoor Theatre.
 Coordination of the comprehensive renovation of the Hermann Park Golf Course (completed by BSL Golf Corporation).
 Coordination of the Hermann Park Miniature Train track expansion.
 Planting of over 2,400 new trees.
 The park-wide installation of new park furnishings such as light fixtures, benches and trash cans.

The Conservancy also developed a Maintenance and Operations Master Plan Study for Hermann Park - the first such comprehensive study ever for this flagship park of Houston. The study identified many concerns for preserving and protecting Hermann Park, including a gap of 20,000 maintenance hours for the Park. In response, the Conservancy hired a Manager of Volunteer Programs. In 2004 over 1,200 volunteers provided over 14,000 hours of volunteer service in the park.

Attractions 

Arbor in the Pines
Bayou Parkland
Bloch Plaza Cancer Survivor's Plaza
Brays Bayou
Buddy Carruth Playground for All Children
Chinese Pagoda
Hermann Park Golf Course
Hermann Park Jogging Trail
Hermann Park Pedal Boats
Hermann Park Railroad ( narrow gauge train ride)
Houston Garden Center
Fragrance Garden
Houston Museum of Natural Science
Cockrell Butterfly Center
Houston Zoo
Japanese Garden
Judson Robinson, Jr. Community Center
Lake Overlook
Mary Gibbs and Jesse H. Jones Reflection Pool
Marvin Taylor Exercise Station
McGovern Centennial Gardens
McGovern Lake
Bob's Fishing Pier
Mecom Fountain
Miller Outdoor Theatre
Molly Ann Smith Plaza, features four interactive fountains
Pioneer Memorial
Pioneer Memorial Log House Museum
Sam Houston Monument
Urban Forest in Bayou Parkland

References

Further reading
"Hermann Park." In Houston: Present and Past in Contrast, Houston Chronicle.
Hermann Park: A Brief History by Barrie Scardino (Archive) - Friends of Hermann Park Action Plan 2000
Big Park, Little Plans:  A History of Hermann Park by Stephen Fox (Archive)

External links

Miller Outdoor Theatre
ASLA Awards

 
1914 establishments in Texas
Parks in Houston
Protected areas established in 1914
Urban public parks